Marvin Garrett (born July 28, 1963) is an American bareback rider.

Life and career 
Garrett was born in Belle Fourche, South Dakota. He is the brother of Mark Garrett, a bareback rider.

In 1998, Garrett survived a plane crash and was hospitalized at the UC Davis Medical Center. In the same year, he was inducted into the ProRodeo Hall of Fame.

References 

1963 births
Living people
People from Belle Fourche, South Dakota
ProRodeo Hall of Fame inductees